The Battle or Siege of Pyongyang may refer to:

Siege of Wanggeom-seong (108 BC), fought during the Han conquest of Gojoseon
Siege of Pyongyang (371), fought during the Goguryeo–Baekje War of 371
Siege of Pyongyang (668), fought during the Goguryeo–Tang War
Siege of Pyongyang (1592), fought during the Japanese invasions of Korea
Siege of Pyongyang (1593), fought during the Japanese invasions of Korea
Battle of Pyongyang (1894), fought during the First Sino-Japanese War
Battle of Pyongyang (1950), fought during the Korean War